Øksnesavisa (the Øksnes Gazette) is a local Norwegian newspaper published in Myre in Nordland county, covering events in the municipality of Øksnes. The paper is edited by Hjalmar Martinussen. It was founded in 1991 and it is published every Friday. Øksnesavisa is printed by the company K. Nordahls Trykkeri in Sortland.

Circulation
According to the Norwegian Audit Bureau of Circulations and National Association of Local Newspapers, Øksnesavisa has had the following annual circulation:
2004: 1,748
2005: 1,801
2006: 1,768
2007: 1,842
2008: 1,694
2009: 1,657
2010: 1,695
2011: 1,724
2012: 1,655
2013: 1,672
2014: 1,619
2015: 1,511
2016: 1,583

References

Newspapers published in Norway
Norwegian-language newspapers
Øksnes
Mass media in Nordland
Newspapers established in 1996
1996 establishments in Norway